Sasha Glasgow (born 19 July 1998) is an Australian netball player in the Suncorp Super Netball league, playing for the West Coast Fever.

Glasgow began her professional netball career at the Thunderbirds as a training partner in the 2017 season and had a breakthrough year after making her debut for the senior team. Glasgow had an interrupted season in 2018 and missed several matches, as she battled with injury and mental health issues. She was re-signed by the Thunderbirds for the 2019 season. In 2019, Glasgow had an excellent season before rupturing her left ACL in the penultimate round of the season.

She then rehabbed and made her return to the Thunderbirds in the 2020 season. After four years with the Adelaide Thunderbirds, the club announced Glasgow would be leaving Adelaide to become a free agent where she was then signed with the West Coast Fever for the 2021 season.

References

External links
 Super Netball profile

1998 births
Australian netball players
Adelaide Thunderbirds players
Living people
Suncorp Super Netball players
Australian Netball League players
Southern Force (netball) players
Netball players from South Australia
Contax Netball Club players
South Australian Sports Institute netball players
South Australia state netball league players
West Coast Fever players